David Dortort (born David Solomon Katz; October 23, 1916 – September 5, 2010) was a Hollywood screenwriter and producer, widely known for his role as producer in two successful NBC television series: Bonanza (1959–73) and The High Chaparral (1967–71). Dortort's focus shifted in the late 1960s to the newer series, leaving the production of Bonanza largely to his associates during its last five and a half years (1967–1973).

From 1954–55, Dortort was involved in directing and writing for The Public Defender. He produced The Restless Gun (1957–59), The Cowboys television version (1974), and a prequel series featuring younger versions of the Bonanza characters called Ponderosa (2001), which was produced with Beth Sullivan. In 1979–1980, he created the 13-week CBS miniseries, The Chisholms. Michael Landon appeared in a supporting role in the pilot for The Restless Gun, starring John Payne, aired on March 19, 1957, as an episode of The Schlitz Playhouse of Stars and Dan Blocker played multiple roles in five episodes of The Restless Gun.

Alan W. Livingston of NBC hired Dortort to write the screenplay for the pilot episode of Bonanza.  He did it at night, while producing The Restless Gun by day.

In 2001, the alumni association of City College of New York, where he had studied history, honored him with its John H. Finley award.

Personal life
A native of New York City, Dortort was married for 67 years to the former Rose Seldin, who died September 30, 2007, at age 92. They had two children, Wendy (Mrs. Czarnecki) and Fred. Loved riding horses.

Death
David Dortort died in his sleep at his home in Los Angeles, California, on September 5, 2010, a month and a half before his 94th birthday, following a history of heart disease.

Writings
Dortort published two books, Burial of the Fruit in 1947 and The Post of Honor in 1949.

Filmography

Films

Television

References

External links 

 

1916 births
2010 deaths
American television writers
American male television writers
Bonanza
Television producers from California
Writers from New York City
Writers from Los Angeles
City College of New York alumni
NBCUniversal people
Screenwriters from California
Screenwriters from New York (state)
Television producers from New York City